Lieutenant colonel Sir James Hayes Sadler  (11 October 1851 – 21 April 1922) was a British colonial administrator and governor of Kenya and the Windward Islands.

Early life and education
Sadler was born to Colonel Sir James Hayes Sadler and Sophia-Jane Sadler (née Taylor) on 11 October 1851 in London, England. In 1875, he married Rita Annie Smith (1856–1918), and had three sons.

Career
He rose to the rank of Lieutenant-Colonel in the British Army, with whom he saw service in India.

In 1893 and again from 1893-94, he was Chief political resident of the Persian Gulf (for Bahrain, Kuwait, Oman, Qatar, and the Trucial States). In 1898 he was appointed Consul-General of the British Protectorate on the Somali Coast. In 1902 he left what is now Somaliland to become Commissioner in Uganda, a position he held until 1907.

On 12 December 1905, Sadler was appointed the first governor of the British East African Protectorate, succeeding commissioner Donald William Stewart who died in office on 1 October 1905. In 1909 he was transferred to be Governor and Commander-in-Chief of the Windward Islands and their Dependencies, a post he filled until 1914.

Honours and awards
After nomination by his father, he became a Fellow of the Royal Geographical Society in December 1901, eventually resigning in 1921. He was appointed Companion, Order of the Bath (CB) in the 1902 Coronation Honours, and appointed Knight Commander, Order of St. Michael and St. George (KCMG) in 1907.

References
 

1851 births
1922 deaths
British Militia officers
Governors of British Somaliland
Governors of the Windward Islands
Companions of the Order of the Bath
Knights Commander of the Order of St Michael and St George
Fellows of the Royal Geographical Society